Euroferrys was a Spanish ferry company that operated a passenger and freight roll-on/roll-off service between Algeciras and the North African ports of Tangier and Ceuta.

History
1998 - Commenced operations.
2006 - Acquired by Acciona Trasmediterránea.
2008 - Merged with parent company Acciona Trasmediterránea.
2010 - HSC Euroferrys Atlantica repainted in Acciona Trasmediterránea livery.

Fleet
Euroferrys operated 2 fast ferries and 5 conventional vessels during its 10 years in operation.

HSC Euroferrys Pacífica
HSC Euroferrys Primero
MS Bahia De Ceuta
MS Euroferrys Atlantica
MS Giulia d'Abundo
MS Punta Europa
MS Mistral

References

Ferry companies of Spain